Hyperlocal is information oriented around a well-defined community with its primary focus directed toward the concerns of the population in that community. The term can be used as a noun in isolation or as a modifier of some other term (e.g. news). When used in isolation it refers to the emergent ecology of data (including textual content), aggregators, publication mechanism and user interactions and behaviors which centre on a resident of a location and the business of being a resident.  More recently, the term hyperlocal has become synonymous with the combined use of applications on mobile devices and GPS technology.  Use of the term originated in 1991, in reference to local television news content.

Definition
A working definition of hyperlocal was published in a 2012 Nesta report, describing it as "online news or content services pertaining to a town, village, single postcode or other small, geographically defined community".

Content
Hyperlocal content has two major dimensions: geography and time.  The dimensions are measures of the relevance or value perceived by the content consumer in time and space.  The higher the content scores on these dimensions the more relevant the content becomes to the individual and the less it becomes to the masses. Hyperlocal content is targeted at or consumed by people or entities that are located within a well defined area, generally on the scale of a street, neighborhood, community or city.  Hyperlocal content must also be relevant in time.  The nature of the evolution of hyperlocal content follows these two dimensions.  By combining the two dimensions we can identify types of hyperlocal content throughout history.  In the distant past, hyperlocal content was low on the geographic dimension, meaning that the content met only broad needs of larger populations across bigger areas, and also low on the time dimension: relevance was perceived over long timescales.  Examples include almanacs, town criers and written postings or other similar forms of infrequent content delivery mechanisms.  More recent hyperlocal content scores higher on the geographic and time dimensions because it delivers more diverse content that targets geographic areas and remains relevant at much smaller time scales such as days and weeks not months and years.  Recent examples of hyperlocal delivery mechanisms include neighborhood focused news sources, neighborhood voucher packs and neighborhood websites.  More recently, hyperlocal content has evolved to include GPS enabled internet integrated mobile applications which score highly on both the geographic and the time dimensions.  They are capable of delivering content that is relevant not just in a community but relevant right down to the individual within a geographic area that can be measured in meters and blocks not towns and neighborhoods.  They are also capable of delivering content relevant at very short timescales such as seconds or minutes not just days or weeks.

Websites
Hyperlocal websites can focus on very specialized topics—i.e., stories and issues of interest only to people in a very limited area. So, for example, school board meetings, restaurant, community group meeting, and garage sales can receive prominent coverage. For example, Forumhome.org focuses on issues likely of interest only to the few thousand residents of the small New Hampshire towns it serves. Another example is Rheebo, a hyperlocal website that build communities around things people are passionate about. Hyperlocal sites may also focus on particular issues. For example, NewWest.net focus on issues relating to balancing economic development and environmental concerns in quickly growing towns in the Rocky Mountain West such as Boulder, Colorado, and Bozeman, Montana (see Exhibit 4.3). "Our core mission is to serve the Rockies with innovative, particularly journalism and to promote conversation that help us understand and make the most of the dramatic changes sweeping our region," the site notes. Much of the content on NewWest.net comes from freelancers and citizen contributors.

In recent years hyperlocal websites have been created to enable the concepts of the Sharing economy or Collaborative consumption. These websites allow peer communities to share human or physical assets. Examples include Yelp, Airbnb, TaskRabbit, eBay, Craigslist and Krrb. Many of the best-known hyperlocal news sites have sprung up independently, with the battle cry "local doesn't scale," but larger media companies have been interested in the concept as well. Formerly a much-vaunted subsidiary of AOL, Patch Media runs a large US based hyperlocal network of sites. According to a March 2015 article in CIO magazine, "Legions of underserved local advertisers were supposed to flock to Patch sites, leaving national publishers in the collective dust. . . . Of course, this wasn't how it played out. Scores of Patch sites were left inactive as the a company reexamined its strategy. Sure, hyperlocal content sounded great -- everyone wants to know what's happening around them -- but the flawed business model couldn't sustain it. Not enough big advertisers were targeting local markets."

Another model for a national company running hyperlocal sites is franchising, such as was being done by 2010 startup Main Street Connect.

The Washington Post Company also made a commitment to developing hyperlocal sites. Rob Curley, who has been called the "hyperlocal guru" for his previous work in Lawrence, Kansas, and Naples, Florida, joined washingtonpost.com in part to develop hyperlocal sites for that paper. The first Curley-led washingtonpost.com effort focused on Loudoun County, a fast-growing suburb in Northern Virginia. The site loudounextra.washingtonpost.com underwent a branding change to loudenextra.com, but that now redirects to a section of the parent paper, www.washingtonpost.com.

Some hyperlocal sites included detailed searchable community events calendars and restaurant information, a complete listing of churches (including 360-degree inside views and recordings of sermons) and police blotter information updated every day. "Knocked down mailboxes will be newsworthy", Curley promised. "What we're doing is taking the local and treating it like it's the superstar". Others at washingtonpost.com have high hopes for the hyperlocal sites. "It's a big effort", says managing editor Jim Brady. "When you take our daily traffic and combine it with Rob Curley's expertise—if it can't work here, it can't work anywhere".

Some journalists, not surprisingly, are skeptical of the hyperlocal movement's focus on the often mundane information of daily life. Hyperlocal "has the potential to trivialize a media organization's brand and further saturate news sites with myopic local (and frequently unedited) content, perhaps at the expense of foreign and national reporting", said an article in the American Journalism Review. Still, media companies are searching for new ways to reach audiences with content that interest them, and hyperlocal definitely holds that potential. BBC's Van Klaveren says journalistic organizations need to embrace both the so-called "big-J" journalism and the hyperlocal: "We need to move beyond news to information".

Social media 
Social networking sites originally did not host hyperlocal content but were the largest distributors of such content hosted on other sites. This is because of the contemporary nature of sharing and the predominantly local composition of user's network in which content is shared. This type of distribution is secondary (done by users) in contrast to the primary distribution done by the content hosting site itself (e.g. Craigslist). In recent years there has been a shift in user behavior to use Social Networking sites for both creating as well as sharing hyperlocal content. Prime examples exist in the phenomenon that Whatsapp is being increasingly used for community organization and eCommerce despite having no feature support for these activities. Facebook also hosts 60x more event than eVite (the leading site which specializes in events only). This user behavior suggests that an effective hyperlocal distribution is a more important consideration for users than the superior quality of the content itself. Since 2010, evidence shows that Social Networking sites have been mobilizing to aid and leverage this user behavior. Google acquired Zagat in 2011. Since 2012 Facebook has been adding new features to create varied hyperlocal content e.g. Blogs, Events. In early 2015 Facebook announced the feature to mark a post as sold and later in 2015 it introduced a C2C payment system. Many believe these steps as precursors to an imminent launch of Facebook Classifieds and Marketplace, most likely rolled into one.

Magazines and newspapers 
While many traditional print publications are shutting down or publish exclusively online, local newspapers in small towns can still make a profit. National companies that mail full-color glossy hyperlocal magazines to targeted neighborhoods include N2 Publishing and Best Version Media. Comparing themselves to Facebook, they publish mostly user-generated content written by local residents and homeowners associations.

GPS-based mobile apps
The most recent incarnation of hyperlocal content grew out the combination of satellite based location services and advanced wireless data built into mobile devices.  Satellite-based location services allow a high degree of physical location precision.  When combined with a mobile device's access to the vast set of Internet data and services, hyperlocal takes on new dimensions.  Realtime internet awareness of an individual's precise location in time allows people and entities to consume or deliver hyperlocal content that is relevant to specific individuals at very small time scales.

Hyperlocal GPS mobile apps, in particular, change the nature of human interaction with their environment by providing a much faster, richer and relevant source of information.  The mobile Internet data connection available to hyperlocal apps allows GPS location data to be fused with Internet data to improve the decision process of the user.  Examples of these types of hyperlocal content providers are Google Maps, Foursquare and LaunchLawyer.  In contrast to printed maps, the mobile Google Maps app allows users to identify places and interests around their current GPS location.  In contrast to rating services or directories, the mobile Foursquare app uses GPS location data to enable users to make more informed choices and receive better deals.  In contrast to printed or online lawyer directories, the GPS-enabled LaunchLawyer mobile app combines GPS awareness with the ability to almost instantly get a lawyer.  In each case the combination of mobile device, GPS and the Internet changed the manner in which consumption of information, services or goods took place.

Other manifestations

There are other types of data which have local or hyperlocal relevance, or be of interest to residents - e.g. a government statistic on crime rates in one's neighborhood. Such data, while relevant to residents are of a qualitatively different type.

Market penetration
For large corporations, successfully targeting local populations can involve either shedding or leveraging corporate identity:
 Shedding corporate identity  Starbucks' 15th Avenue Coffee & Tea cafe in Seattle was not branded with its corporate owner until January 2011. Starbucks continued Roy Street Coffee as a separate brand. By shedding the corporate identity, Starbucks hoped to better cater to the local culture through various events and unique offerings. Coffee tastings from experts and open mic night are examples of programs the national coffee chain offered without having it associated with the Starbucks brand.
 Leveraging corporate identity  The New York Times is tapping into the hyperlocal market online, through "mentor" programs. Essentially, the NY Times wants to have a hand in the editorial process of hundreds of local media outlets. By polishing online news content with their expertise, they seek to gain small portions of advertising revenue from those digital publications with whom they own a stake.

Media structure
While there are various ways in which hyperlocal content is being created and published, blogs have become a key part of the hyperlocal ecology. Their basic roles evident in the space include individual blogs, blog networks, and aggregators.

Some others initiatives are made for this purpose in the USA by the company Marchex, and in FRANCE by the network ProXiti. They are developing networks of thousands hyperlocal news sites like www.10282.net (Manhattan 212) or www.75016.info (paris 16eme arrondissement).

In response to the burgeoning number of hyperlocal news sites in New Jersey, The Citizens Campaign founded the Hyperlocal News Association (HNA). The HNA works to foster and encourage growth of new hyperlocal sites across the state.

Hyperlocal Marketing
Hyperlocal Marketing is marketing for businesses in certain geographic areas. These are usually focused on geographies such as neighborhoods, towns, streets, and spots located near well-known landmarks. For example, a hyperlocal search targets 'near me' searches like 'coffee shop near me'. This type of search can also be phrased as 'coffee shop' in London.

See also
 Location-based service

References

External links
 Online Neighbourhood Networks Study - UK-based research published in November 2010 exploring the ways in which people communicate online using local citizen-run websites, the impact of that communication, and the implications for local service providers.

 
Journalism terminology
1991 neologisms